Energy statistics may refer to:
 E-statistics, a class of tests and statistics built upon Euclidean distances, created by Gábor Székely
 Statistical study of energy data, statistics applied to the field of energy